The PSA World Tour 2014 is the international squash tour organised circuit organized by the Professional Squash Association (PSA) for the 2014 squash season. The most important tournament in the series is the World Championship held in Doha in Qatar. The tour features three categories of regular events, World Series, which feature the highest prize money and the best fields, International and Challenger.

2014 Calendar

Key

January

February

March

April

May

July

August

September

October

November

December

Year end world top 10 players

Retirements
Following is a list of notable players (winners of a main tour title, and/or part of the PSA World Rankings top 30 for at least one month) who announced their retirement from professional squash, became inactive, or were permanently banned from playing, during the 2014 season:

 Karim Darwish (born 29 August 1981 in the Cairo, Egypt) joined the pro tour in 1999, reached the world no. 1 ranking in January 2009. Keeping the spot for eleven month in 2009. He reached the final of the World Open in 2008, lost against Ramy Ashour. The Egyptian also won two Qatar Classic titles in 2008 and 2010, one Sky Open title in 2009, one El Gouna International title in 2010 and the Saudi International in 2008. After competing a last time the Hong Kong Open, he retired in October .
 Hisham Mohd Ashour (born 29 May 1982 in Cairo, Egypt) joined the pro tour in 2000, reached the singles no. 11 spot in February 2012. He won 2 PSA World Tour titles including the National Bank Financial Group Open in Montréal in Canada in 2010. He retired during the 2014 season after competing a last time in the Florida State Open in 2013.

See also
Professional Squash Association (PSA)
PSA World Series 2014
PSA World Rankings
PSA World Series Finals
PSA World Open
WSA World Tour 2014

References

External links
 PSA World Tour

PSA World Tour seasons
2014 in squash